Stereo is a 1969 Canadian science fiction film directed, written, produced, shot and edited by David Cronenberg in his feature film debut. Starring Ronald Mlodzik, who would go on to appear in later Cronenberg films Crimes of the Future, Shivers, and Rabid, the film was Cronenberg's first feature-length effort, following his two short films, Transfer (1966) and From the Drain (1967). The plot follows several young volunteers who participate in a parapsychological experiment.

Summary
The film purports to be part of a "mosaic" of educational resources by the Canadian Academy of Erotic Enquiry. It documents an experiment by the unseen Dr. Luther Stringfellow. A young man (Ronald Mlodzik) in a black cloak is seen arriving at the Academy, where he joins a group of young volunteers who are being endowed with telepathic abilities which they are encouraged to develop through sexual exploration. It is hoped that telepathic groups, bonded in polymorphous sexual relationships, will form a socially stabilising replacement for the "obsolescent family unit". One girl develops a secondary personality in order to cope with her new state of consciousness, which gradually ousts her original personality. As the volunteers' abilities develop, the experimenters find themselves increasingly unable to control the progress of the experiment. They decide to separate the telepaths, which results in two suicides. The final sequence shows the young woman who developed an extra personality wearing the black cloak.

Cast

Production
The film was shot in black and white, and silent because the Bolex camera Cronenberg was using made too much noise. A commentary, purportedly by various followers of Stringfellow's theories, and parodying scientific and metaphysical jargon, was added later.
The film was shot at the Andrews Building of the University of Toronto's Scarborough College.

Analysis
The film embodies several themes now common within Cronenberg's body of work. The exploration (voluntary or otherwise) of new states of consciousness via sexual experimentation is a major theme in Shivers, Videodrome, Dead Ringers, Naked Lunch, M. Butterfly and Crash. The idea of telepathy induced by an unknown scientist recurs in Scanners, as does the image of one tormented telepath who uses an electric drill to pierce his own forehead in what Stereo'''s commentary refers to as "an act of considerable symbolic significance".

Home video
The film has been included as a special feature in multiple releases of other Cronenberg films, including in standard definition on Blue Underground's Blu-ray release of Fast Company, in high definition on Criterion release of Scanners and also in high definition on a bonus disc in Arrow Video's UK Blu-ray release of Videodrome. The bonus disc from Videodrome was later released on its own as David Cronenberg's Early Works together with the director's first two short films and his sophomore feature Crimes of the Future''.

References

External links
 
 

1969 films
English-language Canadian films
Canadian avant-garde and experimental films
1960s science fiction films
Canadian science fiction films
Mad scientist films
Canadian independent films
Canadian black-and-white films
Canadian mockumentary films
Films directed by David Cronenberg
Canadian body horror films
1969 directorial debut films
1960s English-language films
1960s Canadian films